The 2016 European Men's and Women's Team Badminton Championships was held in Kazan, Russia, from February 16 to February 21, 2016. This tournament also serves as European qualification for the 2016 Thomas & Uber Cup.

Medalists

Men's team

Group stage

Group 1

Group 2

Group 3

Group 4

Group 5

Group 6

Ranking of second-placed teams

Knockout stage

Quarterfinals

Semifinals

Final

Women's team

Group stage

Group 1

Group 2

Group 3

Group 4

Group 5

Ranking of second-placed teams

Knockout stage

Quarterfinals

Semifinals

Final

References

2016
2016 in badminton
Badminton tournaments in Russia
2016 in Russian sport
Sport in Kazan
2016,European Men's And Women's Team Badminton Championships
February 2016 sports events in Russia